Prison overcrowding is a social phenomenon occurring when the demand for space in prisons in a jurisdiction exceeds the capacity for prisoners. The issues associated with prison overcrowding are not new, and have been brewing for many years. During the United States' War on Drugs, the states were left responsible for solving the prison overcrowding issue with a limited amount of money. Moreover, federal prison populations may increase if states adhere to federal policies, such as mandatory minimum sentences.  On the other hand, the Justice Department provides billions of dollars a year for state and local law enforcement to ensure they follow the policies set forth by the federal government concerning U.S. prisons. Prison overcrowding has affected some states more than others, but overall, the risks of overcrowding are substantial and there are solutions to this problem.

Prison history 
The prison system started in Europe in the 16th century. The main focus of imprisonment at this time was for temporary holding before trials. Despite the crime committed, all assumed criminals were confined in cells with one another, even children. There were many deaths within the prison system in the 16th century due to the lack of prisoner care and the mass spread of sickness. It was the 17th century when the Bridewell was created and had the main focus on inmate training and education. All within this time, the prisons introduced staffing to create a steadier system. As the 18th century approached, prisoners were forced into hard and manual labor that lasted from morning to dawn. English philosopher Jeremey Bentham introduced a utilitarianism theory to help create more of a moral standard for the treatment and rehabilitation of inmates. His idea was to bring the understanding that inmates were rehabilitable. He wanted to introduce ethical thinking and proper decision-making into the inmate's life's in hopes they could rejoin society. 

As the Great Depression hit, the crime rates increased due to individuals having to commit crimes for survival. Although there were still rising numbers of incarcerations from 1929–to 1970, the prison population increased dramatically when Nixon's War on Drugs called for mandatory sentencing. Around the time Nixon's act was introduced, another act was put in place allowing an individual to have two convictions with a serious felony, then placed in prison for life. Within the Three Strike Law, there was a 500% increase of incarcerations from 1970–1999.

United States 
It was estimated in 2018 that there were a total of 2.3 million inmates incarcerated. Around 1.3 million of those inmates were incarcerated within the State Prison systems. The prison population is half that of China, while China's population is four times that of the United States, indicating the United States incarceration rate is twice that of China. Although the United States holds many inmates, it is at 103.9% of prison capacity. Comparatively, Haiti is the most overcrowded at 454.4%.

Colorado is one of the many states dealing with the prison overcrowding issue.  According to the Colorado Division of Criminal Justice (2019), “The Colorado prison population is expected to increase by 20.5% between fiscal years 2018 and 2025, from an actual year-end inmate population of 20,136 to a projected population of 24,261” (p. 5).  Overcrowding in prisons is often due to recidivism.  One contributing factor to prison overcrowding is parolees who re-offend by violating their parole supervision.  Colorado saw an increase of 8% from the fiscal year 2017 to the fiscal year 2018 for parolees who returned to prison for technical parole violations (Colorado Division of Criminal Justice, 2019, p. 15). A possible solution for, “What would it take to reduce overcrowding in Colorado Prisons?”, is the implementation of technological systems.  Technological systems involve the use of electronic monitoring bracelets.

Causes
Although offenders are being released, most have not received proper rehabilitation tactics to keep them from committing another crime. This often leads reoccurring offenders back into the prison system. There has been an increase in waitlisted or lack of specialized programs (drug, alcohol, intoxicated driving courses) that allow inmates to have the proper rehabilitation. Some crimes are just simply not given the option for parole, which holds inmates in the system for an extended time or even life.

Risks
The rise of overcrowding has resulted in many issues such as:

 Poor health care
 Increased gang activity within the prisons
 Increase in individual mental health issues
 Violence/Racism
 Spread of disease
 Staff stress

Prison overcrowding could create a range of consequences that have become prevalent in the world today. First, prison overcrowding could affect resources per prisoner. The more inmates that are admitted, the fewer resources there are to distribute. Due to the lack of resources, inmates may be forced to spend large amounts of time doing nothing rather than becoming engaged in an activity. The amount of resources continues to reduce as more prisoners are admitted, and social support services become more limited. With a small amount of space and resources within the prisons, prisoners progress more slowly through the steps to release, and their numbers accumulate more quickly. The combination of those two factors could lead to the prison system slowing down, and prisoners' progress would also begin to move slowly. If the prisoners' progress is slowed, then their exit is slowed as well. This will heavily increase overcrowding and results in a facility reaching maximum capacity at a faster rate.

Prison overcrowding comes with an opportunity cost. The amount of money spent on mass incarceration annually could be allocated to other areas of need, such as public safety or the reduction of crime.  Every year, $182 billion is spent on mass incarceration. Within that total, approximately $81 billion is spent on public corrections agencies and about $63 billion on policing. Much of this money is given to the staff to supervise large numbers of inmates for long periods of time. For example, in the state of Alabama, it's possible to witness a correctional officer supervising up to 250–⁠300 high-risk offenders for an extended period of time. These circumstances can result in the increase of prisoner violence. In 2011, there was an approximately 40% increase from the prior year in inmate violence that lead to some serious injuries.

In addition to Alabama, Delaware, and California are also great examples of shown consequences due to prison overcrowding. In February 2017, a group of inmates from the James T. Vaughn correctional center in Delaware were involved in the hostage of four correctional officers. This resulted in the murder of Lt. Steven Floyd and the injury of many others. Vaughn is Delaware's largest prison, and has been under much scrutiny for years; however, nothing has been done about the overcrowding problems within the state's corrections department. After the death of Floyd, more than 100 officers retired early or quit because of the increased dangers of working at Vaughn, thus leading to low staffing levels. Furthermore, by the end of 2010, California's prison facilities contained on average 175 percent over the required capacity, leading to the triple-bunking of prisoners. During the 2011 U.S. Supreme Court decision Brown v. Plata, the California prison system held about 156,000 inmates, which was twice as many as the requirement of approximately 85,000 maximum capacity. In a ruling of Brown v. Plata, the Supreme Court concluded that California's correctional facilities violated prisoners' Eighth Amendment rights. Overcrowding in those prisons caused inmates to receive poor medical and mental health care, not including the inhumane conditions due to lack of resources and space.

Amnesty International reported on 25 January 2021 the abuse of prisoners in Egypt not only by physical/mental torture, cruelty, or inhumanity but also by overcrowding of the prison cells with the arrested activists and rights defenders, despite the Covid-19 pandemic. According to the concerned Amnesty spokesperson, Philip Luther, the Egyptian prison authorities showed no regard to the wellbeing or lives of the prisoners and crammed them all into the country’s already overcrowded prisons, ignoring their health requirements. According to the report “What do I care if you die? Negligence and denial of health care in the Egyptian prisons”, despite overcrowding, the prisoners received no medication or toiletries from the prison authorities and had to rely on their visiting family members for the same.

Solutions
One way to manage populations within the prison system would be to prevent new crimes from being committed. Some alternatives include:
 Alternative programs that provide mental health services, drug diversion programs, or house arrest (especially for minor crimes)
 Building more prisons
 Increasing the chances of parole
 Releasing those that have committed crimes that are now legal
Findings resulting from the research conducted suggest that technological systems are a viable solution for prison overcrowding:

This proposed solution would be applied to individuals who commit non-violent crimes.  
Technological systems are estimated to be less expensive than housing inmates in prison facilities. The Federal Register of the United States reports the average cost for incarceration of federal inmates was $36,299.25 for fiscal year 2017.  This breaks down to $99.45 per day. 
Bagaric, Hunter, and Wolf (2018) estimate, “An ongoing cost of technological incarceration of between $10,000 and $15,000 per annum per prisoner, including amortization of the initial development costs” (p. 121).  
Technological systems would aid parole officers in monitoring the parolees’ locations and actions.  Bagaric, Hunter, and Wolf (2018) explain that, “If they attempt to escape, commit harmful acts, or disable or remove their body sensors, the computers monitoring the events will instantly activate the CEDs embedded in their ankle bracelets to administer the electric shock” (p. 109). Law enforcement would immediately be notified so the situation can be assessed.

Despite its risks and consequences, prison overcrowding can be solved in many different ways. First, the use of diversion programs can aid in prisoners avoiding prison entry. Diversion programs are programs that divert, or turn prisoners away from prison time. This could also free up much space within the prisons and prevent faster maximum capacity. More programs that take on rehabilitative and restorative approaches are also needed to divert offenders from prison admission. Restorative justice is when the interaction between the offender and the victim aids in the healing of the victim and the community. This, along with other therapeutic approaches would be more effective than retribution. Other diversion programs consist of intermediate sanctions, such as fines, probation, restitution, and corrections.

Another alternative to prison overcrowding is the use of early release incentives. These are ways to encourage the reduction of prison populations, while motivating the prisoners who are eligible for early release programs. Some early release incentives may include: parole, house arrest, or good behavior, which are also referred to as "backdoor strategies" in that it strives to release prisoners earlier than their sentence expiration. In addition, the construction strategy is a good alternative to prison overcrowding. This comprises building more prisons for more prison admissions. Furthermore, more space would equal better conditions for inmates because there would be more resources left to distribute within the inmates. These alternatives would save tax dollar money and lessen conflicts within the criminal justice system.

One solution the state of Alabama used to alleviate its prison overcrowding issues was the use of leased beds in 2008. Inmates were housed inside of leased facilities that had a strict capacity requirement under federal court order, which helped to reduce overcrowding within the main correctional facilities. In addition, Alabama expanded alternative sentencing options that consisted of community and rehabilitative programs primarily for nonviolent offenders who have drug/substance abuse addictions.   On the other hand, California initiated the transfer of approximately 33,000 nonviolent offenders from state to county jails in 2011, leading to an increase in early releases. The California Department of Corrections and Rehabilitation has also made the efforts of reallocating parolees and inmates safely to other areas to maintain the mandatory population levels within the facilities.

See also
List of countries by incarceration rate
Mandatory sentencing

References

Carson, A.E.. (30 September 2014). Prisoners in 2013 - Bureau of Justice Statistics. Retrieved 20 February 2018, from http://www.bjs.gov/content/pub/pdf/p13.pdf

Incarceration rates in the United States
Crowds